Amey Ganesh Ranawade (born 7 March 1998), is an Indian professional footballer who plays as a defender for Mumbai City in the Indian Super League.

Career

Mohun Bagan
In January 2018, Amey joined the new side Mohun Bagan

Mumbai City FC
In 2020, Amey joined the Mumbai City FC. On 17 June 2021, Ranawade signed four years contract extension with club, where he will stay till May, 2025. He was later included in club's 2022 AFC Champions League squad.

Career statistics

Club

Honours

Club
Mohun Bagan
Calcutta Football League: 2018–19

Mumbai City
ISL League Winners Shield: 2020–21, 2022–23
Indian Super League: Champions 2020–21

References

External links 
 Profile at ESPN
 Profile at Sports Keeda

1998 births
Living people
Footballers from Mumbai
Indian footballers
Association football defenders
FC Goa players
I-League players
Calcutta Football League players
Indian Super League players
AIFF Elite Academy players
Mohun Bagan AC players
FC Bengaluru United players
Mumbai City FC players
India youth international footballers